The Philippines national under-17 football team is the national under-17 football team of the Philippines and represents the country in international football competitions such as the FIFA U-17 World Cup, the AFC U-16 Championship, the AFF U-16 Championship and any other under-17 international football tournaments. The team is controlled by the Philippine Football Federation (PFF), the governing body of football in the Philippines.

Competition records

Performance at the FIFA U-17 World Cup

Performance at the AFC U-16 Championship

Performance at the AFF U-16 Championship

Results and fixtures

2022

Personnel

Current technical staff

Coaching history

Players

Current squad
The following 23 players were called up for 2023 AFC U-17 Asian Cup qualifiers in Jordan.
Caps and goals updated as of 1 October 2022, after the match against .

Recent call-ups

The following players have been called up for the Philippines U17 within the past 12 months.

See also
 Football in the Philippines

Men's
 Philippines national football team
 Philippines national under-23 football team
 Philippines national under-21 football team
 Philippines national under-19 football team

Women's
 Philippines women's national football team
 Philippines women's national under-19 football team

References

Asian national under-17 association football teams